The Port of Albany is a Western Australian port located on the south coast of the state next to the city of Albany. The port has two tugs available for steerage, Elgin and Wandilla.

Tugboats of Australia